Cyprus–Mexico relations are the diplomatic relations between the Republic of Cyprus and the United Mexican States. Neither country has a resident ambassador. Both nations are members of the United Nations.

History
In 1960, Mexico recognized Cyprus' independence from the United Kingdom. On 21 February 1974, Cyprus and Mexico established diplomatic relations. In 1981, Cyprus opened an embassy in Mexico City, its first in Latin America. In 1991, Mexico opened an honorary consulate in Nicosia.

In 1974, Mexico took a neutral stance during the Turkish invasion of Cyprus, however, Mexico concurs with the resolutions issued by the United Nations Security Council that the basis for a fair and balanced solution to the Cyprus problem and has insisted on the sovereignty, independence and territorial integrity of Cyprus. In September 1990, Cypriot Foreign Minister, Georgios Iacovou, paid a visit to Mexico and met with his Mexican counterpart Fernando Solana. During the visit, Secretary Solana condemned the occupation of part of the territory of Cyprus by foreign troops and hoped a solution would be found within the United Nations.

In June 1997, a Mexican congressional delegation, led by Congressional Deputy Juan José Osorio Palacios; paid a visit to Cyprus to enhance bilateral relations between both nations. In October 2000, Mexican Foreign Undersecretary, Juan Rebolledo Gout, paid a visit to Nicosia. In May 2004, Cyprus joined the European Union. That same month, Cypriot President Tassos Papadopoulos and Foreign Minister Georgios Iacovou attended the Latin America, the Caribbean and the European Union Summit in Guadalajara, Mexico.

In November 2009, the Cypriot Government donated to the Museo Nacional de las Culturas more than 100 ethnographic and historical pieces from Cyprus, as well as books and CDs that account for the culture of that country. In February 2014, the Mexico-Cyprus Friendship Group was created by the Mexican Congress in order to increase cultural and tourist exchanges between both nations.

In 2020, Cyprus closed its embassy in Mexico City.

High-level visits

High-level visits from Cyprus to Mexico
 Foreign Minister Georgios Iacovou (1990, 2004)
 Minister for Education Uranios Ioannides (2002)
 President Tassos Papadopoulos (2004)
 Minister of Agriculture Demetris Eliades (2010)
 Representative Georgios Tassou (2011)

High-level visits from Mexico to Cyprus
 Congressional Deputy Juan José Osorio Palacios (1997)
 Foreign Undersecretary Juan Rebolledo Gout (2000)

Agreements
Both nations have signed a few bilateral agreements such as an Agreement for Cultural, Educational and Scientific Cooperation (1994); Agreement for Touristic Cooperation (1996); Visa Waiver Agreement for Diplomatic and Service Passports (1996); and a Memorandum of Understanding for Mutual Interest Consultations (2000).

Trade
In 2019, trade between both nations totaled US$25 million. Cyprus' main exports to Mexico include: processors; alloy steel products and laminates; wire working machines; filters for lubricants in engines; and optical spectrometers and spectrographs. Mexico's main exports to Cyprus include: malt beer; vehicles; acids and their salts; dish washers; and tequila. Between January 1999 and June 2016, Cypriot companies invested over US$2.8 million in Mexico.

Diplomatic missions
 Cyprus does not have an accreditation to Mexico.
 Mexico is accredited to Cyprus from its embassy in Athens, Greece and maintains an honorary consulate in Nicosia.

See also 
 Foreign relations of Cyprus
 Foreign relations of Mexico
 Mexico–EU relations

References 

 
Mexico
Cyprus